Valeria Puig (May 28, 1988) is a Uruguayan film director.

Family life 
Valeria was born in Montevideo, Uruguay.

Films

References

External links 
 

Uruguayan film directors
Uruguayan women film directors
Uruguayan film producers
1988 births
Living people
People from Montevideo